The Independent is an online British daily newspaper, formerly a print publication.

The Independent may also refer to:

Arts, entertainment, and media

Films
 The Independent (2000 film), starring Jerry Stiller
 The Independent (2007 film), an Australian independent film
 The Independent (2022 film), an American film starring Jodie Turner-Smith and Brian Cox

Music
 The Independents (ska band)
 The Independents (vocal group), 1970s R&B group

Periodicals

Newspapers in the United States
The Independent (Acadiana), published in Lafayette, Louisiana
The Independent (Ashland), published in Ashland, Kentucky
The Independent (Boston), published in Boston, Massachusetts from 1924 to 1928
The Independent (Livermore), published in Livermore, California
The Independent (Massillon), published in Massillon, Ohio
The Independent (Moab, Utah), published in Moab, Utah
The Independent (New York City), a magazine published from 1848 to 1928
The Independent (East Hampton), published in East Hampton, New York
Independent (New Mexico newspaper), published in Gallup, New Mexico
The Independent, published in Pasadena, California
The Independent, published in Presque Isle, Maine by J. S. Hodgdon (publisher)
Evening Independent, formerly published in St. Petersburg, Florida
Independent, or The Independent, the previous name of the Press-Telegram in Long Beach, California
The College Hill Independent, commonly known as The Indy, published by university students in Providence, Rhode Island 
The Daily Independent, formerly published in Kannapolis, North Carolina and merged with The Concord Tribune to form the Independent Tribune
The Independent Newspaper Group, of Massachusetts

Newspapers in other countries
 The Independent (London), an online daily newspaper, formerly a print publication
 The Malta Independent, a Maltese paper and online newspaper
The Independent (Bangladesh), published in Dhaka, Bangladesh from 1995 to 2022
The Independent (Footscray), published in Footscray, Victoria, Australia from 1883 to 1933
The Independent (Gambia), published from 1999 to 2006 in the Gambia
Irish Independent, an Irish daily newspaper
The Independent (Newfoundland), published in St John's, Newfoundland
The Independent (Papua New Guinea), published in Papua New Guinea
The Independent (Perth), published in Western Australia from 1969 to 1986
 The Independent (Uganda), published in Uganda
Nezavisimaya Gazeta Независимая газета (Independent Newspaper), published in Russia since 1990
The Independent Weekly, published in Adelaide, South Australia
Tongnip Sinmun (The Independent), published in Seoul, Korea from 1896 to 1899

Politics
The Independent Group for Change, a British political party formed and dissolved in 2019
The Independents (UK), a British political grouping formed in 2019
The Independents (Liechtenstein), a right-wing populist Eurosceptic political party in Liechtenstein, headed by the former Patriotic Union parliamentarian Harry Quaderer
Independent politician, not affiliated with any political party

Other uses
The Independent (Austin, Texas), a skyscraper in Austin, Texas

See also
Independent (disambiguation)
The Independents (disambiguation)
The Indypendent, newspaper of the New York City Independent Media Center